Andrea Cottini (born 23 March 1976 in Cortona, Tuscany) is a retired Italian footballer. He played as a defender.

External links
 Career profile by tuttocalciatori.net

1976 births
Living people
People from Cortona
Italian footballers
Serie B players
A.C. Perugia Calcio players
A.C. Ancona players
A.C. Cesena players
A.S. Sambenedettese players
A.C. Reggiana 1919 players
S.S.D. Pro Sesto players
Association football defenders
Sportspeople from the Province of Arezzo
Footballers from Tuscany